Jasper Høiby (born 10 May 1977 in Copenhagen, Denmark) is a Danish Jazz musician (double bass) known for his virtuosity and high-energy eloquence.

Career 
Høiby started to play the double bass in Denmark before he moved to the U.K. in 2001 to study at the Royal Academy of Music in London, where got into the London jazz scene. Whilst at the RAM he studied with Milton Mermikides. His time at the Royal Academy of Music led to membership of the Loop Collective, where he later collaborated with Ivo Neame. Now Høiby established himself as a bassist at the London Jazz scene, with performers such as with vibes player Jim Hart, saxophonist Mark Lockheart and vocalist Julia Biel.

Høiby formed Phronesis in 2005, and the debut album Organic Warfare (2007), featured Magnus Hjorth (piano). The second album Green Delay (2009), was dedicated to Høiby's sister Jeanette, who lost her sight, and features the current lineup with Neame and Eger. Both albums were received well by critics and fans and helped to establish Phronesis' reputation as one of Europe's best up- and-coming bands. It was Alive (Edition Records, 2010) that really broke big, gaining rave reviews and Best Album awards from Jazzwise and Mojo. The album was recorded at the Forge in Camden, London. Due to a last-minute problem, Eger was unavailable. American drummer Mark Guiliana took his place temporarily, for the concerts that formed the basis of the album, before Eger returned to the fold. Phronesis has recorded 8 albums, all receiving critical acclaim.

His reading of, and response to, Naomi Klein's influential book on climate change This_Changes_Everything_(book) prompted Høiby to found his band Fellow Creatures.

Discography

As co-leader and leader
With Phronesis, trio including Ivo Neame & Anton Eger
2007: Organic Warfare (Loop Records)
2009: Green Delay (Loop Records)
2010: Alive (Edition Records)
2012: Walking Dark (Edition Records)
2014: Life to Everything (Edition Records)
2016: Parallax (Edition Records)
2017: The Behemoth (Edition Records) feat. Julian Argüelles arranger & conductor and Frankfurt Radio Big Band
2018: We Are All (Edition Records)
With Fellow Creatures
2016: Fellow Creatures (Edition Records) feat. Mark Lockheart, Laura Jurd, Will Barry and Corrie Dick
With Jasper Høiby's Planet B
 2020: Planet B (Edition Records) feat. Josh Arcoleo and Marc Michel 2022: What it Means to be Human (Edition Records) feat. Josh Arcoleo and Marc MichelWith Malija with Mark Lockheart and Liam Noble (musician)
2015: Malija (Edition Records)
2017: Instinct (Edition Records)

 Collaborations 
With Ivo Neame
2009: Caught In The Light Of Day (Edition Records), Quartet
2012: Yatra (Edition Records), Octet

With Marius Neset
2010: Golden Xplosion (Edition Records)
2013: Birds (Edition Records)

With Ana Silvera
2017: Arcana (Mirabeau Recordings)
2018: Oracles (Gearbox Records)

With Jim Hart's Gemini
2009: Narrada (Loop Records)

With Richard Fairhurst's Triptych
2010: Amusia (Babel Records)

With Compassionate Dictatorship
2007: Coup D'Etat (FMR Records)
2010: Cash Cows (FMR Records)
2013: Entertaining Tyrants (Jellymould Jazz)

With Kairos 4tet
2010: Kairos Moment (Kairos Records)
2011: Statement Of Intent (Edition Records)
2013: Everything We Hold (Naim Records)

With Slowly Rolling Camera
2014: Slowly Rolling Camera (Edition Records)

With Mark Lockheart
2009: In Deep (Edition Records)

With Rory Simmons' Fringe Magnetic
2010: Empty Spaces (Loop Records)
2011: Twistic (Loop Records)
2013: Clocca (Loop Records)

With Sam Crowe
2010: Synaesthesia (F-IRE)

With Magnify
2007: MagnifyWith Tom Arthurs
2008: Explications''

References

External links 

Phronesis website

Danish jazz double-bassists
Male double-bassists
Jazz double-bassists
Avant-garde jazz musicians
Musicians from Copenhagen
1977 births
Living people
21st-century double-bassists
21st-century male musicians
Male jazz musicians
Phronesis (band) members
Edition Records artists